Lioptilodes is a genus of moths in the family Pterophoridae described by Zimmerman in 1958.

Species
Lioptilodes aguilaicus
Lioptilodes albistriolatus
Lioptilodes alolepidodactylus
Lioptilodes altivolans
Lioptilodes antarcticus
Lioptilodes arequipa
Lioptilodes brasilicus
Lioptilodes cocodrilo
Lioptilodes cuzcoicus
Lioptilodes doeri
Lioptilodes fetisi
Lioptilodes friasi
Lioptilodes limbani
Lioptilodes neuquenicus
Lioptilodes ockendeni
Lioptilodes parafuscicostatus
Lioptilodes prometopa
Lioptilodes rionegroicus
Lioptilodes salarius
Lioptilodes subantarcticus
Lioptilodes testaceus
Lioptilodes topali
Lioptilodes tribonia
Lioptilodes yungas
Lioptilodes zapalaicus

Platyptiliini
Moth genera